The qualification for the 2018 Asian Games Field hockey women's tournament was held from 12 to 20 January 2018 in Bangkok, Thailand at the Queen Sirikit 60th Anniversary Stadium.

Results

All times are local (UTC+7).

References

Qualification
2018 Asian Games - Women's qualification
2018 sports events in Bangkok